A tattoo artist (also tattooer or tattooist) is an individual who applies permanent decorative tattoos, often in an established business called a "tattoo shop", "tattoo studio" or "tattoo parlour". Tattoo artists usually learn their craft via an apprenticeship under a trained and experienced mentor.

Apprenticeships
A tattoo artist traditionally earns the title by completing an apprenticeship under the strict guidelines of an experienced senior tattoo artist. A tribal tattoo apprenticeship can last as long as five years. The apprentice will be trained in sanitation and proper safety techniques, typically during the first six months to a year of the apprenticeship. During this time, the apprentice is not allowed to tattoo, but will be expected to maintain the cleanliness of the studio and learn by observation. The cost of apprenticing can range from free labor around the shop to tens of thousands of dollars. Apprentices are generally expected to be excellent at drawing, with an ability to excel at customizing design ideas and genres, as well as various other styles of art in general.

Artwork
Tattoo artists create original tattoo designs for their customers, tattooists use flash (pre-drawn, stock images) or variations of known designs.

Tools

Some of the tools of the trade have greatly evolved while some have stayed the same, such as the tattoo machine. The traditional machine has not changed from its original design and/or concept. With the rise of new machine designs, however, both air- and electric-powered tools such as the rotary and pneumatic tattoo machine have made their way into the industry. 
A practitioner may also use many different needle sets, such as round liner needles, round shader needles, flat shaders, and magnum (mag) needles. The number of needles attached to the needle bar change, as well. For instance, magnum needle groups range from 5 to 55 needles on one bar. A practitioner must have the basic tools to provide a tattoo. All other items at the artist's disposal are as different as each tattoo. Basic tools include the tattoo machine, power supply, clip cord, foot pedal, grip, tips, grip stem, needles, and tattoo ink. In the UK equipment must only be sold to registered studios who are provided a certificate by their local environmental health department.

Tattoo studio

Policies and regulations

The properly equipped tattoo studio will use biohazard containers for objects that have come into contact with blood or bodily fluids, sharps containers for old needles, and an autoclave for sterilizing tools. Certain jurisdictions also require studios by law to have a sink in the work area supplied with both hot and cold water.

Proper hygiene requires a body modification artist to wash his or her hands before starting to prepare a client for the stencil, between clients, after a tattoo has been completed, and at any other time where cross contamination can occur. The use of single use disposable gloves is also mandatory.  In some countries and U.S. states it is illegal to tattoo a minor even with parental consent, and it is usually not allowed to tattoo impaired persons (e.g. someone intoxicated or under the influence of drugs), people with contraindicated skin conditions, those who are pregnant or nursing, or those incapable of consent due to mental incapacity. Before the tattooing begins the client is asked to approve the position of the applied stencil.  After approval is given the artist will open new, sterile needle packages in front of the client, and always use new, sterile or sterile disposable instruments and supplies, and fresh ink for each session (loaded into disposable ink caps which are discarded after each client). Also, all areas which may be touched with contaminated gloves will be wrapped in clear plastic to prevent cross-contamination. Equipment that cannot be autoclaved (such as countertops, machines, and furniture) will be cleaned with a low level disinfectant and then wiped with an approved high level disinfectant.

The local health department can/will do a hands on inspection of tattoo studios every 4 months in the state of Tennessee. The venue will be graded based on the areas being inspected. If the studio passes an inspection, the health department will sign off on a passing scorecard and the studio will be required to show their score publicly. If the studio fails an inspection, they will be given the opportunity to correct the mistakes (if minor) or be fined (major health risks) and can also be placed out of business on the spot.

Also, the possession of a working autoclave is mandatory in most states. An autoclave is a medical sterilization device used to sterilize stainless steel. The autoclave itself will be inspected by the health department and required to submit weekly spore tests. However if these jurisdictions are up to date, they will not require an autoclave if the practitioners are using 100% disposable tubes and grips which are made of plastic and some grips are made of rubber. These come pre-sterilized for one time use.

Membership in professional organizations, or certificates of appreciation/achievement, generally helps artists to be aware of the latest trends. However, many of the most notable tattooists do not belong to any association. While specific requirements to become a tattooist vary between jurisdictions, many mandate only formal training in blood-borne pathogens, and cross contamination. The local department of health regulates tattoo studios in many jurisdictions. For example, according to the health departments in Oregon and Hawaii, tattoo artists in these states are required to take and pass a test ascertaining their knowledge of health and safety precautions, as well as the current state regulations. Performing a tattoo in Oregon state without a proper and current license or in an unlicensed facility is considered a felony offense.

Representation in popular culture
Even though the practice of tattooing dates back thousands of years, in the 90s there was a social stigma around tattooing and their practitioners. Many tattoo artists as well as people that had tattoos were perceived as social outsiders.

In recent years media coverage on [TV] and [social media] have transformed how modern society feels about tattooing and tattoo artists. Reality TV shows such as Ink Master, Miami Ink and LA Ink created a "hype" around the subject of tattooing which ultimately educated the public on the art of tattooing in detail. These events did not only make tattoos socially acceptable but created a "trend" and "catapulted" tattoos into popular culture. Nowadays, in the United States alone, more than a quarter of the population has at least one tattoo, in other countries that number reaches even higher.

As the popularity of Reality TV shows grew, so did the idolization of the tattoo artists these shows featured. Artists like Kat von D and Ami James attained a celebrity status, which drove other media icons such as Rihanna and David Beckham to get tattooed by them.

Tattoo artists also gained great popularity due to social media. Today, most tattoo artists display their art on social media platforms such as Instagram, Facebook, and Pinterest. Many tattoo artists have gained thousands of followers, admirers, and clientele through these platforms.

"Scratchers"
People who tattoo without proper training in the art of tattooing are commonly known as "scratchers". Scratchers often operate from home, but may also operate from an unlicensed studio. In addition, scratchers may offer reduced rates to attract customers away from professional tattoo shops. In the USA, practicing without a license is a criminal offense in many states.

The practice of tattooing without proper training also carries serious health risks. Studies have shown that there is a significant risk of contracting Hepatitis C when tattoos are carried out using cheap, non-sterilized tattooing equipment. These risks are found to be higher on unregulated premises.

In the UK, Plymouth City Council launched a campaign in 2014 to crack down on scratchers operating within the city "in an attempt to reduce infection and injury through better awareness and training around infection control".

See also

List of tattoo artists

References

Arts occupations
Tattooing
Tattoo artists